Luatangi Samurai Vatuvei (formerly Ruatangi Vatuvei) (born December 8, 1977) is a Tongan-born Japanese rugby union footballer.

Vatuvei played rugby in Japan for Toshiba Brave Lupus in the Top League and has also played for the Japan national rugby union team under the IRB three-year residence qualification.

Vatuvei is extremely strong, usually in the second row but also used by Toshiba coach Masahiro Kunda in the centres. In 2006, Vatuvei obtained Japanese citizenship.

In 2007, Vatuvei moved from Toshiba to Kintetsu Liners, which was demoted from the Top League in the previous season. This did not prevent John Kirwan from including him in the Japan squad for RWC 2007.

Vatuvei was the top try scorer in the 2004-5 Top League season with 18 tries. He is a cousin of New Zealand rugby league international winger Manu Vatuvei and an elder brother of Tonga rugby union international flanker Sione Vatuvei.

References

External links
Luatangi Vatuvei International Statistics at the 2007 Rugby World Cup Official Site

1977 births
Living people
Tongan rugby union players
Japanese rugby union players
Toshiba Brave Lupus Tokyo players
Hanazono Kintetsu Liners players
Toyota Industries Shuttles Aichi players
Tongan emigrants to Japan
Naturalized citizens of Japan
Japan international rugby union players
Tongan expatriate rugby union players
Expatriate rugby union players in Japan
Tongan expatriate sportspeople in Japan
Rugby union locks